The Kahe are an ethnic and linguistic group based southeast of Moshi in Kilimanjaro Region Tanzania. The Kahe language, or Kikahe, is in the Chagga cluster of Bantu languages.  Three dialects are recognized: Kimwangaria, Msengoni and Kichangareni. Kikahe is spoken by 9,130 people, and is one of the smaller language communities in Tanzania.

References

Ethnic groups in Tanzania
Chaga languages